Disco is a boxed set of three Grace Jones's first three albums, released in 2015. The set contains Portfolio (1977), Fame (1978), and Muse (1979), all of which were recorded at Philadelphia's Sigma Sound with disco pioneer Tom Moulton as producer, in their entirety. The albums were remastered and each of the three CDs included seven bonus tracks while the vinyl box maintains the original track listings and offers a fourth record, that collects mainly long versions of the 45s from this era. The LP version includes the original 3 LP releases and a 4th LP which includes 8 tracks with selected remixes, b-sides and edited versions.

Track listing

Charts

References

Albums produced by Tom Moulton
Island Records albums
Grace Jones compilation albums